Arthur Loveridge (28 May 1891 – 16 February 1980) was a British biologist and herpetologist who wrote about animals in East Africa, particularly Tanzania, and New Guinea. He gave scientific names to several gecko species in the region.

Arthur Loveridge was born in Penarth, and was interested in natural history from childhood. He gained experience with the National Museum of Wales and Manchester Museum before becoming the curator of the Nairobi Museum (now the National Museum of Kenya) in 1914. During WW1, he joined the East African Mounted Rifles, later returning to the museum to build up the collections. He then became an assistant game warden in Tanganyika.

In 1924, he joined the Museum of Comparative Zoology in the grounds of  Harvard University in Cambridge, Massachusetts, where he was the curator of herpetology. He returned to East Africa on several field trips and wrote many scientific papers before retiring from Harvard in 1957.

He married Mary Victoria Sloan in 1921, who died in 1972. They had one son.

On retirement, they moved to Saint Helena in the South Atlantic, from where he continued his interest in natural history, publishing several articles on the island's wildlife in the St Helena Wirebird and St Helena News Review in the 1960s & 1970s. He died in 1980 and was buried in St Helena next to his wife.

Legacy
Several species and subspecies of reptiles are named in his honor, including Afroedura loveridgei, Anolis loveridgei, Atractus loveridgei, Elapsoidea loveridgei, Emoia loveridgei, Eryx colubrinus loveridgei, Melanoseps loveridgei, Philothamnus nitidus loveridgei, and Typhlops loveridgei. 

Three species of endemic St Helenian insect were named after him. the cranefly Dicranomyia loveridgeana, the blackfly Simulium loveridgei, and the subgenus Loveridgeana of the hoverfly genus Sphaerophoria, with Spherophora (Loveridgeana) beattiei known on the island as Loveridge's hoverfly. His insect collecting satchel is on display in the St Helena Museum in Jamestown.

Partial bibliography
 Allen, Glover M & Loveridge, Arthur, Mammals from the Uluguru and Usambara Mountains, Tanganyika Territory in Proceedings of the Boston Society of Natural History, Vol 38, No 9, Boston, 1927.
 Barbour, T & Loveridge, A, A comparative study of the herpetological faunae of the Uluguru and Usambara mountains, Tanganyika territory with descriptions of new species in Memoirs of the Museum of Comparative Zoology at Harvard College, Vol. L, No. 2, 1928. 
 Coward, TA, Observations on the Nesting Habits of the Palm Swift (Tachornis parva, Licht) made by Mr Arthur Loveridge in German East Africa in Memoirs and Proceedings of the Manchester Literary and Philosophical Society, Session 1916-1917, Vol 61, Part II, Manchester, 1917.
 Gans, Carl, In Memoriam: Arthur Loveridge in Herpetologica, Vol 37, No. 2, 1981. 

 Green, AA (editor), Obituary: The Late Professor Arthur Loveridge in St. Helena News Review, Vol XII, No. 2098, 22 February 1980.
 Loveridge, Arthur, East African Reptiles and Amphibians in the United States National Museum : United States National Museum: Bulletin 151, Washington, Smithsonian Institution, 1929.
 Loveridge, Arthur, Field Notes on Vertebrates Collected by the Smithsonian-Chrysler East African Expedition of 1926 in Proceedings of the United States National Museum, Vol 73, Article 17, No 2738, Washington, 1928.
 Loveridge, Arthur, Forest Safari, London, Lutterworth Press, 1956.
 Loveridge, Arthur, I Drank the Zambezi, London, Lutterworth Press, 1953.
 Loveridge, Arthur, A List of the Amphibia of the British Territories in East Africa (Uganda, Kenya Colony, Tanganyika Territory and Zanzibar), Together with Keys for the Diagnosis of the Species in Proceedings of the Zoological Society of London, London, 1930.
 Loveridge, Arthur, A List of the Lizards of British Territories in East Africa (Uganda, Kenya Colony, Tanganyika Territory, and Zanzibar) With Keys for the Diagnosis of the Species in Proceedings of the Zoological Society of London, London, 1923.
 Loveridge, Arthur, The Lizards of Tanganyika Territory, Dar es Salaam, The Government Printer.
 Loveridge, Arthur, Many Happy Days I've Squandered, London, Robert Hale, 1949 .
 Loveridge, Arthur, Notes on East African Birds (Chiefly Nesting Habits and Endo-Parasites), Collected 1920-1923 in Proceedings of the Zoological Society of London, London, 1923.
 Loveridge, Arthur, Notes on East African Lizards Collected 1920-1923, with the Description of Two New Races of Agama Lionotus in Proceedings of the Zoological Society of London, London, 1923.
 Loveridge, Arthur, Notes on East African Mammals, Collected 1915-1922 in Proceedings of the Zoological Society of London, London, 1923.
 Loveridge, Arthur, Notes on East African Mammals, Collected 1920-1923 in Proceedings of the Zoological Society of London, London, 1923.
 Loveridge, Arthur, Notes on East African Scorpions and Solifugae, Collected 1916-1923 in Proceedings of the Zoological Society of London, London, 1925.
 Loveridge, Arthur, Notes on East African Snakes, Collected 1918-1923 in Proceedings of the Zoological Society of London, London, 1923.
 Loveridge, Arthur, Notes on East African Tortoises, Collected 1920-1923, with the Description of a New Species of Soft Land Tortoise in Proceedings of the Zoological Society of London, London, 1923.
 Loveridge, Arthur, Notes on the Three British Ophidia in Transactions of the Cardiff Naturalists' Society, Vol XLVI, Cardiff, 1913.
 Loveridge, Arthur, On Natrix Olivacea (Peters), From Pemba Island, and Other Notes on Reptiles and A. Muraenid Fish in Proceedings of the Zoological Society of London, London, 1925.
 Loveridge, Arthur, Preliminary Description of a New Tree Viper of the Genus Atheris from Tanganyika Territory in Proceedings of the New England Zoological Club, Vol XI, 1930.
 Loveridge, Arthur, Rambles in Search of Frogs in Equatoria in Harvard Alumni Bulletin, Cambridge, 1935.
 Loveridge, Arthur, Reptiles of the Pacific World (re-edition in 1946 and reimprint in 1957), 1945.
 Loveridge, Arthur, A Scientist's Trip to Eastern Africa in Harvard Alumni Bulletin, 30 October 1930, Cambridge, 1930.
 Loveridge, Arthur, A Serpent-Seeking Safaria in Equatoria in The Scientific Monthly, Vol L & LI, June & July 1940, New York, 1940.
 Loveridge, Arthur, The Snakes of Tanganyika Territory, Dar es Salaam, The Government Printer.
 Loveridge, Arthur, Tomorrow's a Holiday, London, Robert Hale, 1951.

References

External links
 

1891 births
1980 deaths
British herpetologists
20th-century British zoologists
People from Penarth